Robert John Davies, GC (3 October 1900 – 27 September 1975) was a Royal Engineers officer who was awarded the George Cross (GC) for the heroism he displayed in defusing a bomb which threatened to destroy St Paul's Cathedral on 12 September 1940.

Early life
Davies was born in Newlyn, Cornwall, the son of John Sampson Davies of St Erth and Annie Vingoe. Davies had emigrated to Canada and joined the Canadian Army in 1918. He returned to Cornwall in the 1930s, and on 6 March 1940 was commissioned as a second lieutenant in the Royal Engineers, serving as a bomb disposal officer during the Blitz.

George Cross
On the night 8/9 September 1940, a Luftwaffe air raid on the city of London resulted in an unexploded bomb landing very close to St Paul's Cathedral. The bomb was lodged 27 feet deep in Deans Yard (close to the west end of the cathedral) and took three days to dig out. It was placed on two lorries (joined in tandem) and Davies drove it through deserted streets to Hackney Marshes where it was safely destroyed.

Citation
The citation from a supplement to the London Gazette of 27 September 1940 (dated 30 September 1940) reads:

Sapper George Cameron Wylie was also awarded the George Cross for his part in the same action.

Sergeant James Wilson and Lance-Corporal Herbert Leigh were awarded the British Empire Medal (for meritorious service) (BEM) for their part in the action.

Later war career
After defusing the St Paul's bomb, Davies then served in the Middle East, but returned to the United Kingdom for an investiture at Buckingham Palace in February 1942.

Court-martial
In May 1942, Davies was court-martialled and convicted of eight charges of fraud, obtaining money dishonestly, and theft, he also pleaded guilty to 13 further charges of issuing cheques without ensuring he had sufficient funds to draw on. He was cashiered on 1 June 1942, and sentenced to two years' imprisonment, reduced to 18 months following review by the General Officer Commanding, London District.

He afterwards migrated to Australia and lived with his family in Kogarah, Sydney. The Times of 1 October 1970 reported that his medal had been sold for a then record £2,100. It is now on display at the Imperial War Museum. Upon his death on 27 September 1975 he was cremated and his remains interred at the Northern Suburbs Crematorium, Sydney. His interment niche is located in the "OT" wall, niche 175.

See also
 George Wyllie (GC)

References

Further reading
 Danger UXB by James Owen has several chapters on Davies's life and the St Paul's bomb. Published by Little, Brown, 2010

External links
 http://vingoe.name/George%20Cross.htm

1900 births
1975 deaths
British Army personnel of World War II
British recipients of the George Cross
Bomb disposal personnel
Canadian Expeditionary Force soldiers
People from Newlyn
Royal Engineers officers
Military personnel from Cornwall